Aulacodes semicircularis is a moth in the family Crambidae. It was described by George Hampson in 1897. It is found in Espírito Santo, Brazil.

References

Acentropinae
Moths described in 1897
Moths of South America